The Indonesian shortfin eel (Anguilla bicolor bicolor) is a subspecies of eel in the genus Anguilla of the family Anguillidae. It is found throughout the tropical coastal regions of the Indian Ocean and Western Pacific Ocean.

Showing the typical habits, diet and characteristics of the genus, this species grows to 1.2 m and can live for up to 20 years. Dorsal fin soft rays number 240–250, anal fin soft rays 200–220, Vertebrae between 105 and 109 in number. This fish is lighter underneath, being olive/blue-brown on top. It is easily confused with the Pacific shortfin eel, Anguilla obscura.

References

Indonesian shortfin eel
Fish of the Indian Ocean
Marine fauna of East Africa
Marine fauna of Oceania
Fish of South Asia
Marine fish of Southeast Asia
Indonesian shorten eel